Trevor Shailer (born 31 December 1970 in Levin) is a former boxer from New Zealand, who won a bronze medal at the 1994 Commonwealth Games in Victoria, Canada in the light welterweight class. He also placed seventeenth in the same event at the 1992 Summer Olympics in Barcelona, Spain.

Shailer is the Chief Executive of Sport Manawatū, and has also been employed with the Health Sponsorship Council, and served on the New Zealand Olympic Committee Maori Advisory Group, particularly in preparation for the 2004 Summer Olympics.

References

External links
 
 

1970 births
Living people
New Zealand male boxers
Olympic boxers of New Zealand
Boxers at the 1992 Summer Olympics
Commonwealth Games bronze medallists for New Zealand
Commonwealth Games medallists in boxing
Boxers at the 1994 Commonwealth Games
Light-welterweight boxers
People from Levin, New Zealand
Medallists at the 1994 Commonwealth Games